Aces Go Places IV, also known in the United States as Mad Mission 4: You Never Die Twice, is a 1986 Hong Kong action-comedy film directed by Ringo Lam and starring Samuel Hui, Karl Maka, Sylvia Chang and Sally Yeh. It is the fourth film in the Aces Go Places film series.

Cast
 Samuel Hui as King Kong
 Karl Maka as Albert Au
 Sylvia Chang as Supt. Nancy Ho
 Sally Yeh as Sally Bright
 Cyrus Wong as Baldy Jr.
 Ronald Lacey as Leader of the villains
 Kwan Tak-hing as HK Police Ice hockey team coach
 Roy Chiao as The Professor
 Cho Tat-wah as Officer Wah
 Shih Kien as Interpol Ice hockey team coach
 Pomson Shi as Professor's assistant
 Onno Boelee as Hornsby 
 Peter McCauley as Digger
 Sandy Dexter as Leader of the villains's henchmen
 Gayle-Anne Jones as Leader of the villains's henchwoman
 Fung Ging Man as Albert's 9th floor neighbor
 Chang Kwok-tse as Passenger in tour bus

See also
 Aces Go Places film series

References

External links

1986 films
1980s action comedy films
1986 martial arts films
Hong Kong action comedy films
Hong Kong martial arts comedy films
Hong Kong sequel films
Hong Kong slapstick comedy films
1980s Cantonese-language films
Films directed by Ringo Lam
Films set in Hong Kong
Films shot in Hong Kong
Films set in New Zealand
Films shot in New Zealand
Hong Kong detective films
1986 comedy films
1980s Hong Kong films